John Connaughton is an American business executive. He is a co-managing partner of Boston-based investment firm Bain Capital. He manages Bain Capital’s global private equity business, and is known for his investments in the healthcare industry.



Professional life and education 
Connaughton received a B.S. from the University of Virginia in 1987, and an M.B.A. with honors from Harvard Business School in 1994.

In 1989, Connaughton began working at Bain Capital, transitioning from Bain & Company. Connaughton ran the firm's global private equity business and became co-managing partner in April 2016.

In 2002, Connaughton, along with several other Bain Capital partners, joined with a larger group of private equity and finance executives to acquire the Boston Celtics.

Board memberships 
In 2003, Connaughton was appointed to a supervisory board membership at ProSiebenSat.1 Media, a German broadcasting group.

Connaughton joined the Board of Trustees for Berklee College of Music in 2005.

In 2008, he became director of Quintiles Transnational Corp, a healthcare company in the field of clinical research. In 2016, Quintiles merged with IMS Health, a health IT company, to become IQVIA. Connaughton became a director of IQVIA in October of that year.

Connaughton was appointed to the board of HCA Healthcare for a term through 2014.

He was also appointed to the board of trustees of the Roxbury Latin School for boys for a term through 2022.

In September 2019, Connaughton joined the board of directors of the University of Virginia's Investment Management Company. He has also served on the Board of Trustees at the university's McIntire School of Commerce.

In 2021, he was appointed to the board of GreenLight Fund, a nonprofit fund in the Boston area.

Philanthropy 
Connaughton donated to the development of the Berklee Global Jazz Institute, which opened in 2010.

In 2019, Connaughton and his wife donated $5 million to the McIntire School of Commerce at the University of Virginia to create the Connaughton Alternative Investing Professorship Fund.

Personal life 
In 2012, Connaughton lived in Brookline, Massachusetts with his wife Stephanie.

References 

Living people
American businesspeople
University of Virginia alumni
Harvard Business School alumni
Year of birth missing (living people)